Watson Pond State Park is a public recreation area occupying  on the east side of Watson Pond in the northern portion of the city of Taunton, Massachusetts. The state park comprises a  swimming beach, picnic area, bathhouse and pavilion. Fishing and non-motorized boating are offered.

In the news
In 2006, Watson Pond was reopened for swimming after being closed for 18 years as result of a high bacterial count. In 2010, the park was one of a thousand places given favorable mention by the Great Places in Massachusetts Commission.

References

External links 
Watson Pond State Park Department of Conservation and Recreation

Greater Taunton Area
Taunton, Massachusetts
State parks of Massachusetts
Parks in Bristol County, Massachusetts